Mary Merrill Shadow (July 17, 1925January 2, 1992) was a professor and an American politician who served in the Tennessee House of Representatives from the 10th floterial district from 1949 to 1953, as a member of the Democratic Party.

Shadow was born in Winchester, Tennessee, in 1925, and educated at Tennessee Wesleyan University, University of Alabama, and the University of Kentucky. She defeated incumbent Representative Walter White for a seat in the state house and served until 1953. She was a delegate to the 1956 Democratic National Convention and unsuccessfully ran to be a delegate to Tennessee's constitutional convention and for a seat in the New Mexico House of Representatives.

Early life and education
Mary Merrill Shadow was born in Winchester, Tennessee, on July 17, 1925, to Willis Albert Shadow and Mary Merrill Ermlich. She received a scholarship to the University of Tennessee at Chattanooga in 1943. She graduated from Tennessee Wesleyan University in 1945, University of Tennessee in 1947, and from University of Alabama and University of Kentucky with a Master of Public Administration in 1948. She married David Lawrence Hill, with whom she had seven children, on December 31, 1950. 

Shadow became a political science professor at Wesleyan in 1948. She was appointed as youth chair of the International Christian University's $10 million fundraising campaign in 1950.

Shadow was a member of the Garden Club of America, League of Women Voters, American Association of University Women, and Zeta Tau Alpha.

Career
Shadow was an opponent of E. H. Crump's political machine. Following the Battle of Athens she wrote a research paper on the government of McMinn County, Tennessee. She became secretary-treasurer of the Meigs County Young Democratic Club in 1949. She became chair of the college activities divisions in the Young Democratic Clubs of America.

Shadow announced her campaign for the Democratic nomination for a seat in the Tennessee House of Representatives from the 10th floterial district on April 25, 1948. She defeated incumbent Representative Walter White and Republican nominee Earl Mack Smith in the 1948 election after spending $270. She was the only woman elected to the state legislature in that election, first unmarried woman elected to the state legislature, and received fourteen marriage proposals after her victory. She announced her reelection campaign on June 2, 1950, and defeated White in the election. She did not seek reelection in 1952, and was succeeded by J.R. Fischesser.

Shadow was selected as secretary of the Democratic caucus in the state house in 1949. The Tennessee Press Corps voted her as "one of the five most able and effective members of the House of Representatives" during the 77th session. She was a member of a delegation sent by the Tennessee General Assembly to the second inauguration of Harry S. Truman. During her tenure in the state house she served on the Finance and Ways and Means committees.

Shadow ran to represent Davidson County, Tennessee as a delegate to a constitutional convention in the 1952 election, but lost. She was a delegate to the 1956 Democratic National Convention from New Mexico and supported Adlai Stevenson II.

Later life
Shadow and her family moved to New Mexico in 1952. She ran for a seat in the New Mexico House of Representatives in the 1956 election and was the only female Democratic nominee for state house, but lost to Republican nominee Thomas R. Roberts. Their family moved to Connecticut in 1958, where she became a lecturer in gardening and nutrition. Her husband worked as a theoretical nuclear physicist. She died on January 2, 1992, in Bad Steben, Germany.

Political positions
Shadow supported rewriting the Constitution of Tennessee. She proposed legislation to allow women to serve on petit and grand juries. She supported legislation to repeal anti-closed shop legislation. She supported the elimination of poll taxes. She proposed a repeal in 1951 of the  Butler Act which prevented the teaching of human evolution in state schools. The act was not repealled until 1967.

Electoral History

References

Works cited
 

1925 births
1992 deaths
20th-century American educators
Members of the Tennessee House of Representatives
People from Franklin County, Tennessee
Tennessee Democrats
Tennessee Wesleyan University alumni
University of Alabama alumni
University of Kentucky alumni
University of Tennessee alumni